Tom Lamb (born 19 October 1996) is a former professional Australian rules footballer who played for the West Coast Eagles in the Australian Football League (AFL).  

As a junior, Lamb played at Edithvale-Aspendale Junior Football Club.

AFL career 
Lamb was drafted to the Eagles in the 2014 AFL Draft. He made his AFL debut in Round 1, 2015 against the Western Bulldogs starting as the substitute. After coming on late in the game, Lamb gathered 10 touches, took 4 marks and scored a goal as the Eagles lost by 10 points to the home team. He was delisted by West Coast at the end of the 2017 season.

WAFL career 
Since being drafted to the West Coast Eagles Lamb has played the majority of his football for the Eagle's feeder club, East Perth Football Club in the West Australian Football League (WAFL). In his first season, he impressed at the Royals playing 10 games and kicking 17 goals.

References

External links

 Tom Lamb's WAFL statistics

1996 births
Living people
West Coast Eagles players
East Perth Football Club players
Dandenong Stingrays players
Sandringham Football Club players
Australian rules footballers from Victoria (Australia)